Briastre is a commune in the Nord department in northern France.

Population

Heraldry

Economics 
In Briastre is a chemistry-factory. In the near of Briastre are agriculture farms.

The Lamour Watermill 
The Lamour Watermill, Briastre (French: Le Moulin Lamour) is a museum and art center located in the commune. The water-powered mill and its edifices were built in 1800. Preponderantly operating the mechanical processes of milling (grinding), rolling, or hammering up until the 1930s, the watermill was converted into a museum by the Bellevals in the late 1990s.

See also
Communes of the Nord department

References

Communes of Nord (French department)